Zurbaranbarri is a station on line 3 of the Bilbao metro. The station is also served by Euskotren Trena commuter and regional rail services. The station is located in the neighborhood of Zurbaran, part of the Uribarri district of Bilbao. It opened on 8 April 2017.

Station layout 

Zurbaranbarri follows the same cavern-like station layout shared by most underground stations of the system, designed by Norman Foster, with the main hall located suspended directly above the tracks.

Access 

  Vía Vieja de Lezama (Vía Vieja de Lezama exit) 
  35 Zumaia St. (Zumaia exit, closed during night time services) 
   62, Barrio Zurbaranbarri (Vía Vieja de Lezama exit)

Services 
Unlike the two other lines of the Bilbao metro system (which are operated by Metro Bilbao S.A.), line 3 is operated by Euskotren, which runs it as part of the Euskotren Trena network. Trains from the Bilbao-San Sebastián, Txorierri and Urdaibai lines of the network run through line 3. The station is also served by local Bilbobus lines.

Gallery

References

External links
 

Line 3 (Bilbao metro) stations
Euskotren Trena stations
Railway stations in Spain opened in 2017
Buildings and structures in Bilbao
2017 establishments in the Basque Country (autonomous community)